Paul Boyton (often misspelled Boynton; 1848–1924), known as the Fearless Frogman, was a showman and adventurer some credit as having spurred worldwide interest in water sports as a hobby, particularly open-water swimming.  Boyton, whose birthplace is variously listed as Dublin or Pittsburgh, Pennsylvania, is best known for his water stunts that captivated the world, including crossing the English Channel in a novel rubber suit that functioned similarly to a kayak. As the founder of Sea Lion Park in 1895, Boyton is also known as the originator of the first modern amusement park with a fenced-in enclosure and admission charged at the gate.

Early life and education
Boyton attended Saint Francis University, Loretto, Pennsylvania. Eager for adventure at a young age, he reportedly joined the Union Navy during the American Civil War when he was 15, and in his young adulthood served stints with Benito Juárez's Mexican Navy and the French Franc-tireurs during the Franco-Prussian War. He eventually returned to the United States and helped organize the United States Life-Saving Service, one of the precursors to the modern-day United States Coast Guard.  He was later appointed captain of Atlantic City, New Jersey's lifesaving service.

Expeditions 
While in Atlantic City, Boyton began toying with a rubber suit invented by C. S. Merriman as a life-saving device for steamship passengers. This first immersion suit, which would become Boyton's trademark, was essentially a pair of rubber pants and shirt cinched tight at the waist. Within the suit were air pockets the wearer could inflate at will using tubes. Similar to modern-day drysuits, the suit also kept its wearer dry.  This essentially allowed the wearer to float on his back, using a double-sided paddle to propel himself, feet-forward.

Boyton made numerous expeditions in this suit, swimming up and down rivers across America and Europe to publicize its uses. Boyton would tow a small boat behind him in which he carried his supplies and personal possessions, and sometimes invited newspaper reporters to accompany him.  A canny publicist, Boyton's arrival in small river towns was often heralded by great fanfare.

Among his exploits were: crossed English channel in 24 hours (1875); paddled Rhine 430 miles (1875); Alton, Ill. to St. Louis, Mo. on the Mississippi (1876) and same year Bayou Goula to New Orleans, 100 miles in 24 hours; 400 miles on the Danube in six days (1876); navigated all important rivers of the continent, passed through canals of Venice and crossed the straits of Gibraltar; returned to the U.S. and floated from Oil City, Pa. to the Gulf of Mexico-2,342 miles in 80 days. His longest voyage was in 1881 when he started at Glendive, Mont. and ended at St. Louis, Mo., 1,675 miles.

In 1885, Boyton was involved in the fatal leap from Brooklyn Bridge of Robert Emmet Odlum, brother of women's rights activist Charlotte Odlum Smith.  Catherine Odlum, mother of Robert and Charlotte, blamed Boyton for her son's death.  Boyton wrote Mrs. Odlum a letter disclaiming responsibility, which he also published in The New York Times and other periodicals.  Mrs. Odlum subsequently traveled to New York City to see Boyton.  According to her account, Boyton sent two men to see her who claimed to be a lawyer and a judge, and who warned her not to say anything against Boyton to avoid prosecution for slander.  Catherine Odlum claimed in the biography she wrote of her son that Boyton hid or destroyed letters and telegrams from himself to Robert Odlum urging him to travel to New York and make the Brooklyn Bridge jump.

After the incident, Boyton left New York City and formed an aquatic circus, touring as the main act in Barnum's circus during 1887.  He settled in Chicago in 1888 and noted the success of the attractions Midway at Chicago's Columbian Exposition of 1892. Building on this, in 1894, he opened the first "permanent" amusement park (Paul Boyton's Water Chutes) in Chicago, which was also the first park of any type to charge an admission. The following year, he bought  of land and opened the Sea Lion Park on Coney Island in 1895. He fenced the property and charged admission, an innovation at the time. It would later become Coney Island Amusement Park. Boyton and his sea lions also performed in silent films including Feeding Sea Lions.

In 1902, Boyton sold Sea Lion Park to Frederic Thompson and Elmer "Skip" Dundy, who redesigned the park and renamed it Luna Park, the first of many of that name to come. Paul Boyton's Water Chutes was permanently closed in 1908, a casualty of increased competition from White City amusement parks, Electric Parks, and Luna Parks that arose in the dozen-plus years after the World's Columbian Exposition.

Boyton's rubber suit was featured by Jules Verne in Tribulations of a Chinaman in China as a life saver for the hero and his three companions.

Boyton is a member of the International Swimming Hall of Fame.

References

External links
 Story of Paul Boyton (1892)
 
  from Project Gutenberg.
 Captain Paul Boyton and Sea Lion Park at Heart of Coney Island
 Letters of Paul Boyton
 Paul BOYTON's Chronology from the New York Times archives by M. LOPEZ
 Coney Island - Sea Lion Park
 Genealogy
 Captain Paul Boyton blog (author of Roughing it in Rubber)
 Patent of Clark S. Merriman's inflatable flotation suit

See also
 James Creelman
 List of members of the International Swimming Hall of Fame

1848 births
1924 deaths
American stunt performers
United States Life-Saving Service personnel
Saint Francis University alumni
People from County Kildare
Irish emigrants to the United States (before 1923)